The Minister for Technological Innovation and Digital Transition (Italian: Ministro per l'Innovazione Tecnologica e la Transizione Digitale) is one of the positions in the Government of Italy. The current officeholder is Vittorio Colao, serving in the cabinet of Mario Draghi.

List of Ministers
 Parties

 Governments

References

Innovation